Antoine Wilson (born 1971) is a Canadian-American novelist and short story writer. He was born in Montreal, Quebec, and later lived in Southern California, Central California, and Saudi Arabia. He attended UCLA and Iowa Writers' Workshop. He currently lives in Los Angeles, where he is a contributing editor of the Brooklyn-based literary magazine A Public Space.

Career

His debut novel The Interloper, published by Other Press in 2007, grapples with themes of family, crime, and revenge through the lens of an unreliable narrator. Wilson has said that the novel was partly inspired by the murder of his older brother when Wilson was seven years old. The Interloper was a finalist for the Foreword Book of the Year and was named a Book of the Decade by The L Magazine.

His second novel, Panorama City, was published by Houghton Mifflin Harcourt in 2012. It spent seven weeks on the Los Angeles Times Bestseller list and was widely reviewed. In The New York Times Book Review, Adam Ross noted a shift in Wilson's focus: "If The Interloper was about lighting the way to hell, to paraphrase Milton, here the author's gaze is directed heavenward, toward sanity and the good in all of us. Panorama City is about our struggle to remain open to one another in a world that categorizes and closes us off at every turn."

In Germany, Panorama City was released as Ein Mann Von Welt.

Wilson's short fiction has appeared in A Public Space, The Paris Review, Storyquarterly, Quarterly West, and the Los Angeles Times, as well as Best New American Voices 2001. His stories have received Special Mention in The Pushcart Prize XXX and XXXVII.

In 2022, Wilson appeared on Storybound (podcast) reading an excerpt from Mouth to Mouth.

Awards

In 2001, he was awarded the Carol Houck Smith Fiction Fellowship at the University of Wisconsin Institute for Creative Writing.

In 2005, he was a finalist for the National Magazine Award in Fiction.

Panorama City was named a Best Book of 2012 by The San Francisco Chronicle and an editors' choice by The New York Times Book Review. Panorama City was a finalist for the Southern California Independent Booksellers Association Award in 2013. In 2017, Panorama City won the inaugural San Fernando Valley Award for Fiction from the Friends of the Library at California State University, Northridge.

Mouth to Mouth was longlisted for the 2022 Giller Prize.

References 

Canadian expatriate writers in the United States
American male novelists
1971 births
Living people
American male short story writers
Canadian male novelists
Canadian male short story writers
21st-century American novelists
21st-century American short story writers
21st-century American male writers
21st-century Canadian novelists
21st-century Canadian short story writers
21st-century Canadian male writers